The Shepherd is a 1975 novella by British writer Frederick Forsyth.

Plot 
The Shepherd relates the story of a De Havilland Vampire pilot, going home on Christmas Eve 1957, whose aircraft suffers a complete electrical failure en route from RAF Celle in northern Germany to RAF Lakenheath in Suffolk. Lost in fog over the North Sea and low on fuel, he encounters a De Havilland Mosquito fighter-bomber, which has apparently been sent up to "shepherd" (i.e. guide) him in.

The circumstances of how he is guided to a safe landing, and his subsequent efforts to identify the pilot who saved him, are the central themes of the story.

History 
Forsyth created this original work as a Christmas gift to his first wife Carrie after she requested a ghost story be written for her. Written on Christmas Day 1974, and published near that time a year later, the idea came while trying to think of a setting away from the typical haunted homes, and seeing planes flying overhead. Many have speculated references to preexisting RAF folklore. While Forsyth is a former RAF pilot and could have heard and adapted such a story (either with or without the intent to do so) no references or anecdotal evidence have been put forward to support such claims.

Notable readings and adaptations 
The story has been broadcast "nearly every Christmas since 1979" in Canada on the CBC Radio One news programme As It Happens. Read by Alan Maitland, the recording always airs on the last episode on or before Christmas Eve. In 2018, for the 50th Anniversary special of As it Happens Carol Off, Michael Enright, and Tom Power celebrated the tradition of reading The Shepherd by reading lines from the story.

On 14 December 2014, actor Nigel Anthony performed an original adaptation by Amber Barnfather of The Shepherd, with music and sound effects, at St Clement Danes, the Central Church of the Royal Air Force, in London. The performance, in aid of the RAF Benevolent Fund, was introduced by Frederick Forsyth. Sound design was by David Chilton, with a cappella pieces from the Saint Martin Singers.

On Christmas Eve 2016, BBC Radio 3 broadcast a new adaptation by Amber Barnfather for Between the Ears, performed by actor Luke Thompson. Sound design was by David Chilton, with music and mouth/body percussion by the Saint Martin Singers specially recorded for the production at the church of St Giles in the Fields, and Vampire aircraft sound effects specially recorded at the Royal Air Force Museum London. Between the Ears: The Shepherd won a Gold Radio Award in the 2017 New York Festivals International Radio Program Awards. In April 2017, Between the Ears won the ‘Most Original Podcast’ Gold Award at the inaugural British Podcast Awards.

In 2022, John Travolta confirmed that he is currently filming a cinematic version of The Shepherd on location in West Raynham, Norfolk.

See also
 List of Christmas-themed literature

References

Further reading 
 
 

1975 British novels
Novels by Frederick Forsyth
Christmas novels
British novellas
Aviation novels
Hutchinson (publisher) books

External links 
 'Fireside' Al Maitland reads Frederick Forsyth's The Shepherd at cbc.ca